Hit Men is a studio album by Daevid Allen and Kramer joined by drummer Bill Bacon, released on April 30, 1996 by Shimmy Disc. The three musicians had previously performed together as part of New York Gong in 1978-9, producing the album About Time.

Track listing

Personnel 
Adapted from Hit Men liner notes.

Musicians
 Daevid Allen – vocals, guitar, acoustic guitar, assistant engineer
 Bill Bacon – drums, percussion
 Kramer – vocals, guitar, bass guitar, organ, sampler, tape, production, engineering

Production and additional personnel
 Jed Rothenberg – assistant engineer

Release history

References

External links 
 Hit Men at Discogs (list of releases)

1996 albums
Collaborative albums
Albums produced by Kramer (musician)
Daevid Allen albums
Kramer (musician) albums
Shimmy Disc albums